Julien Sidney Devereux (1805-1856) was an American planter and politician from Texas.

Early life
Julien Sidney Devereux was born on July 23, 1805 in Montpelier, Hancock County, Georgia. His father, John William Devereux, was a farmer.

Career
He served as a Justice of the Peace in Macon County, Alabama in 1835.

He founded the Terrebonne Plantation in Montgomery County, Texas along the San Jacinto River in 1841. By 1846, he established the Monte Verdi Plantation in Rusk County, Texas.

He served in the Sixth Texas Legislature from 1855 to 1856.

Personal life
His first marriage, to Adaline Rebecca Bradley, lasted from 1823 to their divorce in 1843. Later that year, he married Sarah Ann Landrum. They had four sons.

Death
He died on May 1, 1856. He was buried in Rusk County, Texas. The Julien Sidney Devereux Family Papers are kept at the Dolph Briscoe Center for American History on the campus of the University of Texas at Austin.

References

1805 births
1856 deaths
People from Hancock County, Georgia
People from Macon County, Alabama
People from Montgomery County, Texas
People from Rusk County, Texas
American planters
American slave owners